Bliedorn was a hamlet in Clinton County, Iowa, on the Bliedorn Road at Latitude: 41° 54' 9 N, Longitude: 90° 40' 42 W.

History
The Bliedorn post office was open 1900–1903. Bliedorn's population was 12 in 1902.

References

Geography of Clinton County, Iowa